Shock Value is a 2014 American comedy horror film directed by Douglas Rath and starring Malcolm McDowell.

Cast
Zak Hudson as Miles Fowler
Anthony Bravo as Nick
Janelle Odair as Ashley
Michelle Campbell as Justine
Malcolm McDowell as Edmund Dean Huntley

Release
The film was released on VOD on August 1, 2014.

Reception
Matt Boiselle of Dread Central awarded the film three and a half stars out of five.

References

External links
 
 

2014 comedy horror films
American comedy horror films